"Pump It Up!" is a song by Belgian musician Danzel. It was released in 2004 as the second single from his debut album, The Name of the Jam. The song is a mash-up of "Pump It Up!" by Black & White Brothers (1998) and "In the Mix" by Mixmasters (1990). "Pump It Up!" achieved success throughout Europe; it reached the top 10 in more than 10 countries and peaked at number 11 on the UK Singles Chart. In the United States, the song reached number 29 on the Billboard Dance Club Play.

In 2019, the song was remixed by British DJ Endor and issued on Defected Records. It reached number one on the US Billboard Dance Club Songs chart in November 2019, and number eight on the UK Singles Chart in January 2020. The remix was certified double platinum by the Australian Recording Industry Association (ARIA). This remix has taken hold in Michigan Wolverines athletics with it being played after every touchdown.

Track listings

Belgian CD single
 "Pump It Up!" (radio edit) – 3:45
 "Downtown" (vocal club mix) – 7:21

Belgian 12-inch single
A1. "Pump It Up!" (extended mix) – 5:53
A2. "Pump It Up!" (acappella) – 2:29
B1. "Pump It Up!" (club mix) – 7:02
B2. "Downtown" (club mix) – 5:50

German CD single
 "Pump It Up!" (radio edit) – 3:45
 "Pump It Up!" (Profanation 'Trust in Trance' mix) – 6:54
 "Downtown" (club mix) – 5:50

UK CD single
 "Pump It Up!" (radio edit)
 "Pump It Up!" (extended mix)
 "Pump It Up!" (Uniting Nations remix)
 "Pump It Up!" (Jerry Ropero & Denis the Menace remix)
 "Pump It Up!" (Gladiator remix)
 "Pump It Up!" (Saint remix)
 "Pump It Up!" (video)

UK 12-inch single
A1. "Pump It Up!" (Uniting Nations remix)
A2. "Pump It Up!" (Alex K Klubbed Up remix)
B1. "Pump It Up!" (Gladiator remix)

US 12-inch single
A1. "Pump It Up!" (club mix)
A2. "Pump It Up!" (extended mix)
B1. "Downtown" (vocal club mix)

US 12-inch remixes single
A1. "Pump It Up!" (Crowd remix)
A2. "Pump It Up!" (Funky Junction & Joao Da Silva Iberican dub mix)
B1. "Pump It Up!" (Funky Junction & FC Nond Stone remix)
B2. "Pump It Up!" (acappella)

Australian CD single
 "Pump It Up!" (radio edit)
 "Pump It Up!" (Highpass edit)
 "Pump It Up!" (Highpass mix)
 "Pump It Up!" (extended mix)
 "Pump It Up!" (club mix)
 "Downtown" (vocal club mix)

Personnel
 Co-producer – Johan Waem
 Percussion – Philip Cortez
 Producer – Jaco Van Rijswijk
 Vocals – Danzel
 Writers – Djaimin, Mr. Mike

Charts and certifications

Weekly charts

Year-end charts

Certifications

References

2004 singles
2004 songs
2019 singles
Danzel songs
Data Records singles